Stylistic Changes is the first full-length solo album by Norwegian Progressive/Heavy metal guitarist Carl August Tidemann. It was released in 1996.

Track listing
"The Secret Of The Holy Sweep"
"Warriors Of Tritonia"
"Trouble Spot"
"For You"
"The Brighter The Light, The Darker The Shadow"
"Ten Years Too Late"
"Requiem (Of The Grim Sweeper)"

References

http://metal-archives.com/release.php?id=116710

1996 albums